Robert Pierre Guindon (born November 19, 1950) is a Canadian former professional ice hockey forward.

As a youth, Guindon played in the 1962 Quebec International Pee-Wee Hockey Tournament with the Saint-Jérôme team. 

Guindon started his World Hockey Association career with the Quebec Nordiques. He would also play with the Winnipeg Jets.  After the Jets were absorbed by the National Hockey League in 1979, he would play just six games in the NHL before moving to the Tulsa Oilers in the Central Hockey League.  He played one more season with the Oilers before retiring.

Career statistics

References

External links
 

1950 births
Living people
Canadian ice hockey forwards
Detroit Red Wings draft picks
Fort Worth Wings players
Ice hockey people from Quebec
People from Laurentides
Quebec Nordiques (WHA) players
Tulsa Oilers (1964–1984) players
Winnipeg Jets (1979–1996) players
Winnipeg Jets (WHA) players